Abel is a 2010 Mexican comedy film directed by Diego Luna.

Cast 
 Christopher Ruíz-Esparza as Abel
 José María Yazpik as Anselmo
  as Cecilia
 Geraldine Galván as Selene

References

External links 

Mexican comedy films
2010 comedy films
2010s Spanish-language films
2010s Mexican films